Dragan Đukanović (born 29 October 1969) is a Montenegrin professional football coach and former player.

Playing career

Club
Born in Nikšić, Montenegro, during his career he played with OFK Beograd, OFI Crete, Omonia, Örebro, Avispa Fukuoka, Mogren, Racing Paris, Istres and Ethnikos Asteras.

International
He represented Yugoslavia at U21 level.

Club statistics

References

External links

1969 births
Living people
Footballers from Nikšić
Association football forwards
Yugoslav footballers
Yugoslavia under-21 international footballers
Serbia and Montenegro footballers
OFK Beograd players
OFI Crete F.C. players
AC Omonia players
Örebro SK players
Avispa Fukuoka players
FK Mogren players
Racing Club de France Football players
FC Istres players
Ethnikos Asteras F.C. players
Yugoslav First League players
Super League Greece players
Cypriot First Division players
Allsvenskan players
J1 League players
First League of Serbia and Montenegro players
Ligue 2 players
Second League of Serbia and Montenegro players
Serbia and Montenegro expatriate footballers
Expatriate footballers in Greece
Serbia and Montenegro expatriate sportspeople in Greece
Expatriate footballers in Cyprus
Serbia and Montenegro expatriate sportspeople in Cyprus
Expatriate footballers in Sweden
Serbia and Montenegro expatriate sportspeople in Sweden
Expatriate footballers in Japan
Serbia and Montenegro expatriate sportspeople in Japan
Expatriate footballers in France
Serbia and Montenegro expatriate sportspeople in France
Montenegrin football managers
FK Mogren managers
FK Lovćen managers
Expatriate football managers in Bangladesh
Expatriate football managers in Indonesia
Montenegrin expatriate sportspeople in Indonesia